A referendum on family grants was held in Liechtenstein on 27 June 1965. Voters were asked whether they agreed with an initiative to amend the law on the grants. The proposal was approved by 63.4% of voters.

Results

References

1965 referendums
1965 in Liechtenstein
1965
June 1965 events in Europe